Joachim Luetke (born 1957) is a German cross-media artist. He is mostly known for his artwork for bands such as Arch Enemy, Dimmu Borgir, Kreator, Marilyn Manson, Meshuggah, Sopor Aeternus and The Ensemble of Shadows and Rage. His art has also been published in book form and compared to that of H. R. Giger.

Artistic training 
Luetke studied graphic-design in Switzerland during the late seventies, and improved his artistic capabilities at the Academy of Fine Arts in Vienna, Austria. His teacher and mentor was Rudolf Hausner, the grandmaster of Phantastic Realism.

Publications

References

External links 
 Official homepage
 Joachim Luetke - Surreal Art Collective
 Encyclopaedia Metallum Archive
 Official LinkedIn

Living people
1957 births
Academy of Fine Arts Vienna alumni